"Be with You" is a song by British girl group Atomic Kitten. It was written by songwriting trio Bionic, consisting of Greg Wilson, Tracey Carmen and Martin Foster, and recorded for the reissue of the band's second album Feels So Good (2002). Production was helmed by Ash Howes and Martin Harrington, based on Bionic's original track. The disco-fused dance pop song is an adaptation of "Last Train to London" (1979) by English rock band Electric Light Orchestra. Due to the inclusion of the sample, Jeff Lynne is also credited as a songwriter. Its lyrics refer to seducing someone in a nightclub.

In Ireland and the United Kingdom, "Be with You" was released on a double A-side along with "The Last Goodbye", both serving as the album's third single. It peaked at number five and number two on the Irish and UK Singles Charts, respectively. Elsewhere, it was released as the fourth single from Feels So Good in early to mid-2003 and became a top-10 hit in Australia, Hungary, and Poland. An accompanying music video, directed by Jake Nava, is set inside a nightclub. In support of its release, "Be with You" was added to the set list of most of their following concert tours, including The Big Reunion concert series in 2013.

Background
"Be with You" was written by Liverpool-based trio Bionic, consisting of Greg Wilson, Tracey Carmen, and Martin Foster. In 1999, Foster had the idea and sampled the instrumental strings and chorus segments of "Last Train to London" (1979) by English rock band Electric Light Orchestra, written by Jeff Lynne, to create a sketch of a disco track with the notion of making a club track that could be a hit for seeing in the new millennium. Carmen and Wilson heard the potential and collaborated with Foster to take the idea further. Wilson penned the verse lyrics and, in fact, wrote a third verse that was never used.

With Bionic having signed a production deal with Innocent Records, they began auditioning a number of female singers to front the single. However, it was soon decided that the song would be an ideal disco track for Atomic Kitten, and the label had demos mixed by other production teams, including Ash Howes and Martin Harrington. Mixing on "Be with You" was also helmed by Howes, while engineering was overseen by Richard Wilkinson and assistant Rohan Onract. Along with Howes and Harrington's mix, Innocent Records released two 12" promos featuring remixes of the original Bionic track as well as mixes by Olav Basovski and MaUVe.

Chart performance
In Ireland and the United Kingdom, Virgin Records released "Be with You" on a double A-single along with album cut "The Last Goodbye".  Both songs served as the album's third and fourth single, respectively. In the United Kingdom, it became the band's eighth top-10 hit, peaking at number two on the UK Singles Chart in its first week of release. It stayed on the chart for 12 weeks, and managed to sell 182,695 copies in the UK alone. In 2012, the Official Charts Company named "The Last Goodbye"/"Be with You" the group's fifth best-selling single after "Whole Again", "The Tide Is High (Get the Feeling)", "Eternal Flame" and "It's OK!."

The single also became Atomic Kitten's third top-five hit in Ireland, where it peaked at number five on the Irish Singles Chart. Elsewhere released as a standalone single during the first quarter of 2003, "Be with You" reached the top 40 on the majority of the charts it appeared on. In New Zealand, the song went straight in at number 11, just missing the top 10. It also was a top 20 hit in Austria, Portugal, and the Netherlands. Although their lowest charting hit in Denmark, it still managed to peak at number 20. In Germany and Switzerland, the song became a top-30 hit, and in Belgium and Sweden, the single entered the top 40.

Music video

The accompanying music video for "Be with You" was directed by British filmmaker Jake Nava. It marked Atomic Kitten's fourth consecutive collaboration with Nava following the production of the Feels So Good visuals for "It's OK!", "The Tide Is High (Get the Feeling)" and "The Last Goodbye". The video was filmed on a sound stage in October 2002 and shot back-to-back with the video for "The Last Goodbye." According to band member Liz McClarnon, the nightclub setting as well as their individual stylings were heavily influenced by the 1970s disco sound of the song. The video makes heavy use of laser-flashing.

In the music video, the band members portray a group of friends celebrating at a nightclub. The video opens with the doors opening in the club. McClarnon, Natasha Hamilton, and Jenny Frost are dancing on the crowded dancefloor, while the video alternates between both the disco floor, laser scenes, and solo shots throughout. Hamilton is seen on the chairs in a pub, McClarnon is near a wall and Frost is lying on the dancefloor. During the bridge section, they turn the volume down.

Track listings

Double A-side release

Solo release

Credits and personnel
Credits adapted from the liner notes of Ladies Night.

Tracey Carmen – original production, writing
Martin Foster – original production, writing
Jenny Frost – vocals
Natasha Hamilton  – vocals
Martin Harrington
Ash Howes – mixing, production

Jeff Lynne – writing
Liz McClarnon – vocals
Rohan Onract – engineering assistance
Richard Wilkinson – engineering
Greg Wilson – original production, writing

Charts

Weekly charts

Year-end charts

Release history

MAX cover version

"Be with You" is MAX's 27th single and their last on the main avex trax label before the group was moved to the Vision Factory associated avex subsidiary, Sonic Groove. It is a Japanese cover of Atomic Kitten's "Be with You". The song was used as the image song for FamilyMart Dream Match.

Track listing

Personnel and production

Be with You 
 Production - Gee & Satoshi Hidaka (GTS)
 Arrangement - Satoshi Hadaka
 Programming - Satoshi Hadaka
 Mixing - Yoshiaki Onishi
 Recording - Sayuri Taguchi

Don't Lose Yourself 
 Synthesizer Programming - Yasushi Sasamoto
 Electric Guitar - Nozomi Furukawa
 Electric Sitar - Nozomi Furukawa
 Mixing - Junya Endo
 Recording - Sayuri Taguchi

Charts
Oricon Sales Chart (Japan)

References

2002 singles
2002 songs
2004 singles
Atomic Kitten songs
Innocent Records singles
MAX (band) songs
Music videos directed by Jake Nava
Songs written by Jeff Lynne
Virgin Records singles